Bayou L'Ourse is a census-designated place (CDP) in Assumption Parish, Louisiana, United States. The population was 1,978 at the 2010 census.

Geography

Demographics

References

Census-designated places in Assumption Parish, Louisiana
Census-designated places in Louisiana